MasterChef + is a Brazilian cooking competition television series. The series premiered on Tuesday, November 15, 2022 at 10:45 p.m. (BRT / AMT) on Band.

Househusband Astro Ribeiro and retired Pietro Coccaro won the competition over chemist Nadja Celina and executive Sérgio Ferreira on December 13, 2022.

Format 
The difference with this version is that only contestants over 60 years old can participate. The winner receives a R$15.000 cash prize and the MasterChef + trophy.

Contestants

Top 20

Top 8

Elimination table

Key

Ratings and reception

Brazilian ratings

All numbers are in points and provided by Kantar Ibope Media.

References

External links
 MasterChef + on Band

2022 Brazilian television seasons
2022 Brazilian television series debuts
MasterChef (Brazilian TV series)
Reality television spin-offs
Brazilian television series based on British television series
Brazilian reality television series
Brazilian cooking television series
Rede Bandeirantes original programming